Bumbler Bee-Luxe is an insect-themed multidirectional shooter video game developed and published by American studio Dadgum Games in 1997 for the Macintosh.

Gameplay
Bumbler Bee-Luxe is a 2D shooter in which the player is a bee, trying to protect its hive from invaders.

Reception
Next Generation reviewed the Macintosh version of the game, rating it four stars out of five, and stated that "The only downside is that the background never seems to change [...] and sometimes, due to the color scheme, we lost track of enemies against the honey-combed background. Overall though, an excellent effort."

References

External links
Bumbler Bee-Luxe at Incredibly Strange Games (2010)

1997 video games
Classic Mac OS games
Classic Mac OS-only games
Multidirectional shooters
Video games about insects
Video games developed in the United States